Maruia is a locality in the West Coast region of New Zealand. The Shenandoah Highway (State Highway 65) passes through it. Murchison is 65 km north, the Lewis Pass is 39 km to the south-east, and Reefton is 63 km west by road. The Maruia River flows past to the west.

According to the 2013 New Zealand census, Maruia and its surrounds have a population of 183, an increase of 9 people since the 2006 census. There were 96 males and 87 females.

The principal activity is dairy farming. The community celebrated 100 years of settlement in the Maruia Valley in 2005.  The Maruia Valley inspired the environmental lobby group, the Maruia Society (later changing its name to the Ecologic Foundation) and the Maruia Mail Order Catalogue, organised by the New Zealand Nature Company.

Education
Maruia School, a coeducational full primary (years 1–8) school with a roll of  students as of 
dates from 1926.

Notes

Buller District
Populated places in the West Coast, New Zealand